Maureen Pratt is an Australian former professional tennis player.

Pratt, a Victorian junior champion, was ranked amongst the top 10 players in the country at stages of her career and made the singles third round at the 1961 Australian Championships. She originally competed under her maiden name Maureen McCalman and has a daughter, Kerryn Pratt, who played on the professional tour.

References

External links
 
 

Year of birth missing (living people)
Living people
Australian female tennis players
Tennis people from Victoria (Australia)
20th-century Australian women